Ronald Mack Lewis, II (born November 17, 1972) is a former American football offensive lineman in the National Football League for the Washington Redskins.  He played college football at West Los Angeles College and Washington State University.

1972 births
Living people
Players of American football from Los Angeles
American football offensive guards
Washington State Cougars football players
Washington Redskins players
Amsterdam Admirals players
Susan Miller Dorsey High School alumni